Águas de Santa Bárbara is a municipality in São Paulo, Brazil. The population is 6,109 (2020 est.) in an area of 405 km². It was founded in 1868.

References

External links
  Official City Website 

Municipalities in São Paulo (state)
Populated places established in 1868